Avalon is an unincorporated community in southern Livingston County, Missouri, United States. It is located on Missouri Route H, approximately one mile east of U.S. Route 65 and ten miles southeast of Chillicothe.

Avalon was platted in 1869. The community's name is a transfer from Avallon, in France. A post office called Avalon was established in 1872, and remained in operation until 1985.

References

Unincorporated communities in Livingston County, Missouri
Unincorporated communities in Missouri